The 2012–13 Spor Toto Turkish Cup tournament was the 27th edition of what the professional men's basketball teams of Turkey could vie for the Turkish Cup in the final. Fenerbahçe Ülker won their fourth Cup by defeating in the finals Galatasaray S.K. (men's basketball), . The tournament was held at the Galatasaray Medical Park in Bursa, Turkey. It was held from 17 to 21 February. The MVP was David Andersen of Fenerbahçe.

Group stage

Group A
Group A matches played in Adana from 4–6 October.

Group B
Group B matches played in İzmit from 5 to 7 October.

Group C
Group C matches played in Manisa from 5 to 7 October.

Group D
Group D matches played in İzmir from 2 to 4 October.

Final 8
The final rounds were played among the top eight teams out of four groups in 6–10 February 2013. Quarter-finals were played on -7 February 2013. Semi-finals were on 8 February 2013. Final match was played on 10 February 2013.

Finals bracket

Quarter-final

Semi-final

Final

References

External links
Official website

Turkish Cup Basketball seasons
Cup